Leon Mark Dudenhefer (born September 25, 1952) is an American politician. A Republican, he was elected to the Virginia House of Delegates in 2011. He represented the 2nd district, made up of parts of Prince William and Stafford counties in Northern Virginia. Previously, he served 2005–2011 on the Stafford County Board of Supervisors, representing the Garrisonville district. After deciding not to seek re-election to the House of Delegates in 2017, he decided to run for the Stafford County Board of Supervisors again, and was elected by a margin of 12 votes.

Education and family
Dudenhefer received a B.S. degree in Economics from the Louisiana State University in 1974. That same year, he enlisted in the United States Marine Corps. He served in the Corps until 2004, rising to the rank of colonel. He also received an M.B.A. degree from Tulane University and a Master's degree in Computer Information Systems from the University of Phoenix.

Dudenhefer married LaVera Kay Brooks; they had three children. One daughter, Emily, died in an automobile accident in 2004.

Electoral history

Political career
Dudenhefer served on the Stafford County Board of Supervisors 2005–2011; he was its chair for two years.

When the 2nd House district was moved to his area by redistricting, Dudenhefer was unopposed as the Republican nominee for the seat. He defeated Democrat Esteban Garces in the general election, 5767-4507.

In November 2013, Dudenhefer was unseated by Democratic candidate for Delegate, Michael Futrell.

In November 2015, Dudenhefer reclaimed the seat he lost in 2013, narrowly winning against Democrat Joshua King.

In January 2017, Dudenhefer announced that he would not seek re-election to the Virginia House of Delegates. The next month, he announced he would run for his old seat on the Stafford County Board of Supervisors against Democratic incumbent Laura Sellers. Dudenhefer narrowly defeated Sellers, winning the election by 12 votes.

Notes

External links

1952 births
Living people
Republican Party members of the Virginia House of Delegates
County supervisors in Virginia
Louisiana State University alumni
Tulane University alumni
University of Phoenix alumni
People from Stafford, Virginia
21st-century American politicians